HOOPS Visualize is a 3D computer graphics designed to render graphics across both mobile and desktop platforms.

Features
The program features a unified API that allows users to add interactive 3D visualization to both desktop and mobile applications. HOOPS Visualize provides a hierarchical scene management engine capable of handling a range of graphics entities, together with a graphics pipeline and interaction handling algorithms. It includes clash detection, multi-plane sectioning, and large model visualization, along with many other features.

History
The HOOPS 3D Graphics System was originally developed in the mid-1980s in the CADIF Lab at Cornell University. Ithaca Software later formed to commercialize the technology. Subsequently, HOOPS was widely adopted for Computer-Aided Design (CAD), Computer-Aided Manufacturing (CAM) and Computer-Aided Engineering (CAE) software.

In 1993, Autodesk, Inc. acquired Ithaca Software.  In 1996, HOOPS was spun out of Autodesk by Tech Soft 3D, Inc., which continues to develop and sell the HOOPS 3D Graphics System under the name HOOPS Visualize. The software is made available free of charge to educational institutions.

Key Features and Capabilities
 Retained-mode graphics system with a supporting database
 Data is structured hierarchically in a scene graph
 Able to use many different contexts for rendering, including DirectX, OpenGL, as well as software and hardcopy
 Interfaces with C, C++, C#, and Java
 Out-of-core rendering mode for visualizing large point-cloud datasets
 Integrates with other engineering SDKs like ACIS, Parasolid, RealDWG, and HOOPS Exchange, as well as industry standard CAD formats
 PMI support, mark-up, model trees, point clouds
 Compatible with all major graphical user interfaces
 Platform independent input architecture

References 

Application programming interfaces
3D scenegraph APIs
C++ libraries